In computing, the Advanced Multimedia Supplements (also JSR-234 or AMMS) is an API specification for the Java ME platform. Practically speaking, it is an extension to JSR 135 Mobile Media API providing new features, such as positional 3D audio processing, audio and video effects processing, better controls for digital camera, and better support for analog radio tuner including Radio Data System. AMMS was developed under the Java Community Process as JSR 234.

Features and profiles 
JSR-234 defines six feature sets, namely Media Capabilities, and each define minimum implementation requirements in order to try to avoid fragmentation and to define a common minimal base line for the implementations. Every JSR-234 implementation must support at least one Media Capability. The six Media Capabilities are described in the table below.

Optional features 
In addition to the Media Capabilities, the device is free to support any of the optional features including:
 controlling additional 3D audio features such as Doppler, size of the source (macroscopicity), directivity and obstruction
 controlling additional audio effects such as chorus and channel virtualization (including stereo widening)
 audio panning
 detailed exposure settings for the camera
 brightness, contrast and gamma settings
 whitebalance
 setting the processing order of the audio and video effects
 setting priorities for the players
 MIDI channel specific effects
 RDS

Versions 

 1.0 2005-05-17
 1.1 2007-02-28 (contains only minor bug fixes and some additional clarifications; no new features or functionality)

Implementations

Mobile devices 
 Nokia Series 40 devices (5th Edition: 3D Audio and Music Capabilities; 6th Edition: Camera Capability controls for Camera, Flash, Focus, Snapshot and Zoom)
 Nokia S60 devices (since 3rd Edition, Feature Pack 1) (3D Audio and Music Capabilities only)
 Sony Ericsson devices (JP-7: Camera Capability only; since JP-8: all areas)

Emulators 
 JSR-234 Reference Implementation (all Media Capabilities)
 Nokia Prototype SDK (all Media Capabilities)
 Series 40 5th and 6th Edition SDKs
 S60 SDKs
 Sun Java Wireless Toolkit

Chipsets and engines 
There are also implementations targeted mainly for mobile device manufacturers.

Other APIs for similar purposes 
OpenSL ES - for 3D audio and audio effects processing via a C-language API
OpenMAX AL - for camera controlling and analog radio via a C-language API

References 
 The official JSR 234 page
 "3D Audio for Mobile Devices via Java", M. Paavola, E. Karlsson, J. Page; presented at the 118th AES Convention, Barcelona, Spain, May 31, 2005; available from AES e-library
 Series 40 6th Edition: Accessing Camera Capability with Advanced Multimedia Supplements API (JSR-234)

Java specification requests